Godson Udochukwu Ukanwa is an Anglican bishop in Nigeria.

Ukanwa is the current Bishop of Isi Mbano.

Notes

Living people
Anglican bishops of Isi Mbano
21st-century Anglican bishops in Nigeria
Year of birth missing (living people)